Rafael Andia (born November 30, 1942) is a French classical guitarist.

Biography 
Born in France of Spanish Republican parents, Rafael Andia first studied the violin but was  attracted by the musical tradition of his family. The flamenco that he then practiced yielded to the classical guitar, but his conception of the instrument remains durably fixed under that first influence.

Rafael Andia will remain a cornerstone for his generation because of a quite complete guitaristic activity. His reputation is as important in the field of contemporary music - where he has premiered some of the more significant works of our times  - as it is in the field of ancient music, where he has widely contributed to the renewal of baroque guitar, particularly through the complete work of Robert de Visée. His contribution also extends to the field of Spanish guitar, by making popular many techniques for that instrument as a teacher of classical and baroque guitar at École Normale de Musique de Paris, where he has been teaching since 1971.

Composer and editorial director, he brings regularly his contribution to the ancient, classical or contemporary repertoire.

Works

Records 

 1974 Les Classiques de la Guitare: Padre Soler, Sousa Carvalho, Domenico Scarlatti, Enrique Granados, Joaquín Turina, Emilio Pujol, Manuel de Falla. Chorus 19733
 1979 Masterpieces of French museums:  Gaspar Sanz, Francisco Guerau, on original 17th-century instruments.  Densité 7
 1984 François Lecocq (1729): works for baroque guitar. (discographic premiere). MW 80045 (GHA 126.062) re-published 2009
 1985 Villa Lobos: The five Préludes and André Jolivet: complete works for solo guitar (discographic premiere). Lyrinx 034
 1986 Robert de Visée (1682/1686): complete works for baroque guitar (discographic premiere). Harmonia Mundi,  box 118688,  CD 901186
 1990 “Guitar”: Murail, Taïra, Reverdy, Drogoz, Ballif (discographic premiere). Adda / Musidisc CD 590019
 1999 Joaquin Turina: transcriptions and complete works for solo guitar (discographic premiere) Harmonia Mundi  CD HMC 905246
 2002 Isaac Albéniz: works for solo guitar (discographic premiere)  Mandala CD Man 5030
 2006 Manuel de Falla: Complete Amor Brujo and other works for solo guitar (discographic premiere)  Mandala CD 5112
 2013  Inmemorial - Ouvres pour Guitare avec Claire Sananikone  Compositions by Rafael Andia   Solstice SOCD 295

Premieres 

 solo guitar
 Claude Ballif: Solfeggietto no 6, op. 36
 Graciane Finzi: Non se muove una foglia
 André Jolivet: Tombeau de Robert de Visée		
 Tristan Murail: Tellur
 José-Luis Narvaez: Vision Clasica del Flamenco
 Michèle Reverdy: Triade
 Henri Sauguet: Musiques pour Claudel
 Yoshihisa Taïra: Monodrame III
 others
 Claude Ballif: Poème de la Félicité, for three female voices, perc. and guitar dir. Yves Prin, Radio- France 1979
 Bruno Ducol: Des Scènes d’Enfants, with Renaud François, flute, Radio-France 1984
 Christiane Le Bordays: Concerto de Azul, guitar and orchestra, Orchestre de Nice-Côte d’Azur, dir. Pol Mule, Radio-France 1976
 Tod Machover: Déplacements, for amplified guitar and computer-generated tape, Festival de la Jeune Musique, Varsovia 1984 (premiere for Europe)
 Philippe Manoury: Musique, for two harps, two perc., mandoline and guitar, dir.Guy Reibel, Radio-France 1986
 Yoshihisa Taïra: Pénombres I et II, (version for one guitar and twelve strings), Ensemble Ars Nova, dir. Philippe Nahon, Maison de la Culture de La Rochelle 1988
 Jean-Jacques Werner: Duo Concertant, with Francis Pierre, harp, Radio-France 1977

Literature 

 Literary and scientific publications
 1969: Calibration of an Ebert-Fastie spectrometer, Thesis at the University of Paris VI
 1970: "Infrared Absorption Spectrum of Methane from 2884 to 3141 cm-1", L. Henry, N. Husson R. Andia and A. Valentin, Journal of Molecular Spectroscopy 36, 511-520 (1970)
 1978: Les Goûts Réunis: La Guitare Baroque, Paris,
 1981: The Guide of the Guitar, Paris, Mazarine editions, for the articles “the Repertory of the Guitar” and “Flamenco”
 1999: Robert de Visée, the two books for guitar (1682–1686), Paris, Éditions musicales transatlantiques, in collaboration with Helene Charnassé and Gerard Rebours
 2000: Francisco Tárrega, the collected guitar works, Heidelberg, Chanterelle verlag, foreword of the two volumes.
 2015 : Libertés et déterminismes de la guitare, essay, Paris, L'Harmattan.
 2016 : Labyrinthes d'un guitariste, témoignage, Paris, L'Harmattan.
 2018 : Rasgueados, novel, Paris, L'Harmattan.
 2019 : Guitarre Royalle, novel, Paris, L'Harmattan.

Collections 

 La Guitare contemporaine, collection Rafael Andia
 Claude Ballif, Solfeggietto op. 36
 Leo Brouwer, El Decameron Negro
 Stephen Dembski, Sunwood
 Philippe Drogoz, Prélude à la mise à mort
 Philippe Drogoz, Voyage pour une guitare
 Arnaud Dumond, 5 Haïkus Atonaux
 Félix Ibarrondo, Cristal y Piedra
 André Jolivet, Le Tombeau de Robert de Visée
 Aram Katchaturian, Prélude for guitar
 Edith Lejet, Balance
 Tod Machover, Déplacements
 Georges Migot, Pour un hommage à Claude Debussy
 Tristan Murail, Tellur
 Yves-Marie Pasquet, Les Oiseaux du regard
 Michèle Reverdy, Triade
 Jeannine Richer, Piège VI
 Anne Sédès, Pièce n° 1
 Yoshihisa Taïra, Monodrame III
 Alain Weber, Quasi Sonatina
 Guitarra Ibérica, collection Rafael Andia
 Rafael Andia,
 Canciones Flamencas Antiguas for two guitars
 Improvisación al Estudio de Cano
 Impulsivo
 Flamenco Miniatura, 8 pieces for beginners
 Miguel Castaños
 Flamenco de base
Williams Montesinos
 Imágenes para Aguirre
 José-Luis Narvaez
 Cerro de la Luna
 Rumba
 Sonata Flamenca for two guitars
 Visión Clásica del Flamenco
 Joaquín Turina
 Cinq Danses Gitanes, op. 55 for guitar
 Tango, op 8 n°2 for guitar
 Narciso Yepes
 Jeux Interdits for four guitars

References

External links 
 

French classical guitarists
French male guitarists
1942 births
Living people
École Normale de Musique de Paris alumni
Academic staff of the École Normale de Musique de Paris